Zealand Academy of Technologies and Business (Danish: Sjællands Erhvervsakademi, EASJ) or Zealand is a school of higher education established in 2008 due to a merger of nine Danish Colleges, most dating back more than 100 years. It is regularly ranked within the top 4 business academies in Denmark and is currently ranked first in the Køge Municipality. Zealand operates five campuses in Region Zealand to the west and south of Copenhagen, Denmark. The campuses, with a total of some 3,200 students, are located in Næstved, Roskilde, Køge, Slagelse and Nykøbing Falster. The school is an independent self-owning institution subordinated to the Ministry of Science, Innovation and Higher Education. Degree programs offered are mainly applied degrees, especially in technology, IT, and business. The academy grants undergraduate and academic degrees but not master's or doctoral degrees. In addition to full-time studies, the academy offers supplemental education, part-time programs at bachelor's level, and short-term courses for people who need to strengthen their qualifications.

History
The Zealand Academy of Technologies and Business was founded in 2008 and initially offered higher education programs in cooperation with nine different vocational schools in Region Zealand. As of August 2012, these higher education programs were officially transferred from the nine schools to the administration of the Academy. The number of students has almost doubled since then

Campuses and programmes

Campus Roskilde
Campus Roskilde currently occupy four different locations across Roskilde.

Programmes
Campus Roskilde offers the following programmes:

 International
 Marketing Management
 Computer Science
 International Sales and Marketing Management
 Web Development

 In Danish
 Markedsføringsøkonom
 Bachelor i International Handel og Markedsføring
 Datamatiker
 Webudvikler (PBA)
 Laborant
 Fødevare-, ernærings- og procesteknolog
 Have- og parkingeniør

Campus Køge
Campus Køge is located in Køge.

Programmes
Campus Køge offers the following programmes:

International
 Multimedia Design and Communication
 Logistics Management
 Service, Hospitality and Tourism Management
 Digital Concept Development

In Danish
 Administrationsøkonom (Dansk)
 Diplomuddannelse i ledelse (Dansk + Engelsk)
 E-koncept (Dansk + Engelsk)
 Multimediedesigner (Dansk + Engelsk)
 Serviceøkonom (Dansk + Engelsk)
 Logistikøkonom (Dansk + Engelsk)

Campus Næstved
Campus Nøstved is located at Femøvej 3 on  Næstved.

Programmes
International
 Commerce Management
 International Sales and Marketing Management

In Danish
 Finansøkonom
 Handelsøkonom
 Autoteknolog
 Byggetekniker
 Bygningskonstruktør
 Datamatiker
 Innovation og entrepreneurship

Campus Slagelse
Campus Slagelse is located in Slagelse.

Programmes
Campus Slagelse offers the following programmes:

International
 Service, Hospitality and Tourism Management (English)

In Danish
 Digital konceptudvikling (PBA)
 Installatør-VVS
 Jordbrugsteknolog
 Jordbrugsvirksomhed (PBA)
 Laborant
 Multimediedesigner
 Produktionsteknolog
 Serviceøkonom

Campus Nykøbing

Programmes
International programmes
 Marketing Management
 Multimedia Design and Communication

In Danish
 Markedsføringsøkonom 
 Multimediedesigner
 El-installatør

See also
 KEA – Copenhagen School of Design and Technology

References

External links
 Official website
 Profile on the Education Guide website of the Danish Ministry of Science, Innovation and Higher Education
 Translations of Danish educational terms through proclamations of the Ministry of Science, Innovation and Higher Education

Higher education in Denmark
Education in Roskilde
2008 establishments in Denmark